Patraus (Greek Πατράος; 340 BC – 315 BC) was an ancient Paeonian king preceded by Lycceius and succeeded by Audoleon. It has been proposed that   Ariston, who notably served as a cavalry general to Alexander the Great, was Patraus' brother.

References

External links
Ancient Coinage of Paeonia, Patraos
Paeonian kings
4th-century BC rulers